Canale Arena (formerly De La Salle Gymnasium) is the on-campus athletic facility for Christian Brothers University in Memphis, Tennessee.

Buccaneers 

Canale Arena is home to the Buccaneer and Lady Buccaneer basketball and volleyball teams.

The Buccaneer basketball team was the Gulf South Conference champion in 2008.

History

Origin 
The original structure was completed in 1950. At that time, it was the largest indoor arena in the city of Memphis.

Renovation 
The arena was fully renovated in 2004. Among renovations were the addition of new stadium seating, bleachers, a hospitality suite, a Hall of Fame conference room, restrooms, a lobby, and Canale Cafe. The arena has a stated capacity of 1,000.

Namesake 
The athletic facility was originally named De La Salle Gymnasium in honor of St. John Baptist de la Salle, the founder of the Christian Brothers. The Lasallian Christian Brothers, a Roman Catholic religious institute, founded Christian Brothers University in 1871.

When the facility was reopened and blessed on December 10, 2004, it was renamed in honor of John D. Canale, Jr. Memphis businessman John D. Canale, Jr. served on the university's board of trustees from 1970 to 1983 and received the university's prestigious Maurelian Medal in 1994 for his support of and service to the university. Canale's history of contribution to the university includes raising funds in 1949 to build De La Salle Gymnasium. Additionally, Canale donated the funding to build the John Canale Pool on campus in 1986. The pool was named in honor of Canale's father, John D. Canale, Sr., a lifelong supporter of the Christian Brothers and valedictorian of the Christian Brothers College class of 1891.

References

External links 
 Photographs of Canale Arena
 Christian Brothers University Athletics
 Christian Brothers University

Christian Brothers University
Christian Brothers Buccaneers and Lady Buccaneers
1950 establishments in Tennessee
Basketball venues in Tennessee
College basketball venues in the United States
Event venues established in 1950
Sports venues in Memphis, Tennessee
Sports venues completed in 1950